Ziya is a Turkish given name for males and females, it is of Arabic origin, in Turkish Ziya means light.

Given name

First name
 Ziya Doğan, Turkish football manager
 Ziya Gökalp, Turkish sociologist
 Nazmi Ziya Güran, Turkish impressionist painter
 Ziya Hurşit, person executed for attempting an assassination against Mustafa Kemal Atatürk
 Ziya Müezzinoğlu (1919–2020), Turkish economist, diplomat and politician
 Ziya Onis, Turkish economist
 Ziya Saylan, Turkish medical doctor
 Ziya Şengül, Turkish footballer
 Ziya Songülen, Turkish footballer
 Ziya Tong, television personality and producer
 Ziya Yildiz, Bosnian footballer

Middle name
 Halit Ziya Uşaklıgil, Turkish author

Other uses
Zia (disambiguation)

Turkish unisex given names